The Cispus River  is about  long and flows into the Cowlitz River at Lake Scanewa in the Cascade Range of Washington. Its tributaries drain most of south-central and southeastern Lewis County, extreme northeast Skamania County, and some of western Yakima County.

Its main stem begins in Lewis County in a high, glacial valley to the north of Snowgrass Flats in the Goat Rocks Wilderness, located on the Gifford Pinchot National Forest. From here the river flows in a southwesterly direction and takes on the waters of several important headwater tributaries such as Walupt Creek.

About  from its mouth, the Cispus River receives Muddy Fork from the left. Muddy Fork starts  from this junction, at Mount Adams' Lava Glacier and is named for the glacial debris and silt in the water which give the river a muddy appearance. The Cispus River flows through a heavily forested valley, much of the forest regrown after the Cispus Burn, which occurred the first decade of the 20th century and consumed most of the lower drainage.

The rushing Canyon Creek enters the river originating high on the slopes of Mount Adams. From here on, the Cispus River flows westerly, passing campgrounds and trails in the Gifford Pinchot National Forest. Two tributaries, Yellowjacket and McCoy Creeks, flow into the river from the south about midway though its course. Beyond here, the river passes beneath Tower Rock, a prominent quartz diorite monolith on the south side of the river. Soon after this the river leaves the Gifford Pinchot National Forest and enters the Weyerhaeuser Cowlitz Tree Farm. The Cispus River ends its course entering the Cowlitz River at Lake Scanewa, just upstream from Cowlitz Falls and Riffe Lake.

There is a stream flow monitoring station on the river which sends its data live to the United States Geological Survey (USGS). Whitewater rafting also takes place on the Cispus River.

See also
List of Washington rivers
List of tributaries of the Columbia River

References

External links
 USGS map showing Cispus River
 Water flow on the Cispus River
 

Rivers of Washington (state)
Rivers of Lewis County, Washington
Rivers of Skamania County, Washington
Rivers of Yakima County, Washington
Mount Adams (Washington)
Gifford Pinchot National Forest
Midway High Lakes Area
Geography of Skamania County, Washington
Goat Rocks